{{Automatic Taxobox
| image = Cafius algophilus.jpg
| image_caption =  Cafius algophilus 
| taxon = Cafius
| display_parents = 2
}}Cafius' is a genus of relatively large rove beetles in the family Staphylinidae. There are about 8 described species in Cafius found in North America, and approaching 50 globally .

Species
 Cafius aguayoi Bierig, 1934
 Cafius bistriatus Er.
 Cafius canescens (Mäklin, 1852)
 Cafius femoralis Cafius lithocharinus (LeConte, 1863)
 Cafius luteipennis Le Conte
 Cafius nauticus (Fairmaire, 1849)
 Cafius seminitens Horn
 Cafius sulcicollis (LeConte, 1863)

References

Further reading

 NCBI Taxonomy Browser, Cafius
 Arnett, R. H. Jr., and M. C. Thomas (eds.). (2001). American Beetles, Volume I: Archostemata, Myxophaga, Adephaga, Polyphaga: Staphyliniaformia. CRC Press LLC, Boca Raton, Florida .
 
 Richard E. White. (1983). Peterson Field Guides: Beetles''. Houghton Mifflin Company.

Staphylininae